The Second Battle of Tripoli Harbor was a naval action that occurred during the American naval blockade which took place in Tripoli Harbor on  July 14, 1804. The battle was part of the First Barbary War between forces of the United States and the forces of the Eyalet of Tripolitania.

Background
Commodore Edward Preble had assumed command of the U.S. Mediterranean Squadron in 1803. By October of that year Preble had begun a blockade of Tripoli harbor. The first significant action of the blockade came on October 31, when  ran aground on an uncharted coral reef and the Tripolitan Navy was able to capture the ship along with its crew and Captain William Bainbridge. Philadelphia was turned against the Americans and anchored in the harbor as a gun battery.

On the night of February 16, 1804, a small contingent of U.S. Marines in a captured Tripolitan ketch rechristened  and led by Lieutenant Stephen Decatur, Jr. were able to deceive the guards on board Philadelphia and float close enough to board the captured ship. Decatur's men stormed the vessel and decimated the Tripolitan sailors standing guard. To complete the daring raid, Decatur's party set fire to Philadelphia, denying her use to the enemy. Decatur's bravery in action made him one of the first American military heroes since the Revolutionary War. The British Admiral Horatio Nelson, himself known as a man of action and bravery, is said to have called this "the most bold and daring act of the age."<ref>Tucker, Spencer. Stephen Decatur: a life most bold and daring. Naval Institute Press; 2005. . p. xi.</ref> Even Pope Pius VII stated, "The United States, though in their infancy, have done more to humble the anti-Christian barbarians on the African coast than all the European states had done..."

Battle

Preble attacked Tripoli outright on July 14, 1804, in a series of inconclusive battles, including a courageous but unsuccessful attack by the fire ship USS Intrepid under Master Commandant Richard Somers. Intrepid, packed with explosives, was to enter Tripoli harbor and destroy itself and the enemy fleet; it was destroyed, perhaps by enemy guns, before achieving that goal, killing Somers and his crew.

Aftermath

The actions against Tripoli harbor continued to prove indecisive until September when Commodore Samuel Barron assumed command of the Mediterranean Squadron and focused the fleet's attention on supporting William Eaton's attack on Derne, which ended in a victory.

Notable veterans

Several of the United States' early naval heroes served in the blockade including Stephen Decatur, William Bainbridge, Charles Stewart, Isaac Hull, David Porter, Reuben James and Edward Preble. Collectively referred to as Preble's Boys, many of these officers would play a significant role in the upcoming War of 1812.

Notes

Sources
 The Barbary Wars, 1801-1805
 Tripolitan War
 Burning of the Frigate Philadelphia, 16 February 1804
 Six Frigates: The Epic History of the Founding of the U.S. Navy by Ian W. Toll, 2005
 If By Sea'' by George C. Daugham, 2008

Naval battles of the Barbary Wars
United States Marine Corps in the 18th and 19th centuries
Naval battles involving Ottoman Tripolitania
History of Tripoli, Libya
1804 in the Ottoman Empire
1804 in Africa
Conflicts in 1804
19th century in Tripoli, Libya
July 1804 events